William Porter may refer to:

Law and politics
 William Porter (Attorney General) (1805–1880), attorney-general of the Cape Colony
 William Field Porter (1784–1869), New Zealand politician
 William G. Porter, American police officer
 William J. Porter (1914–1988), American diplomat; former ambassador to Canada and Saudi Arabia, among others
 William Archer Porter (1825–1890), British lawyer and educationist
 William Haldane Porter (1867–1944), British civil servant
 William Porter (MP) (died c. 1593), English politician
 William Porter (fl.1388), Member of Parliament (MP) for Southwark
 William Porter (died 1436), MP for Cambridgeshire
 William W. Porter (1856–1928), American attorney and legal author
 William Wood Porter (1826–1907), American military officer and jurist

Music
 William Porter (organist) (born 1946), American organist and improviser
 Willy Porter (born 1964), American singer-songwriter

Others
 William D. Porter (1808–1864), flag officer of the United States Navy
 USS William D. Porter (DD-579), ship named after him
 William H. Porter (1861–1926), prominent banker in New York City
 William Porter (archbishop) (1887–1966), English Roman Catholic archbishop in present-day Ghana
 William Porter (athlete) (1926–2000), American track and field athlete
 William Sydney Porter (1862–1910), American writer who used the pen name O. Henry
William Sydney Porter Elementary School, school in Greensboro, North Carolina
 William T. Porter (1809–1858), American writer and founder of Spirit of the Times
 William A. Porter (1928–2015), founder of E*TRADE
 William Townsend Porter (1862–1949), American physician, physiologist, and medical educator
 William Henry Porter (writer) (1817–1861), American Presbyterian minister and writer
 William Henry Porter (surgeon) (1790–1861), president of the Royal College of Surgeons in Ireland

See also
 Bill Porter (disambiguation)
 Billy Porter (disambiguation)

Porter, William